Little Hayfield is a hamlet in the Peak District National Park, in Derbyshire, England.  It lies on the A624 between Hayfield and Glossop. At the centre of the hamlet is the Lantern Pike pub.  Sheepdog trials and fell racing take place in Little Hayfield.

From Clough Mill, a former water-powered and later steam-powered textile mill converted to apartments in 1989, a footpath leads to the summit of Lantern Pike.

References

Hamlets in Derbyshire
Towns and villages of the Peak District
High Peak, Derbyshire